Whiteboys (Original Motion Picture Soundtrack) is the soundtrack album to Marc Levin's 1999 comedy film Whiteboyz. It was released on July 20, 1999 via TVT Soundtrax and consists entirely of hip hop music. Production was handled by several record producers, including Arkatech Beatz, Che Pope, Daz Dillinger, DJ Hurricane, Irv Gotti, Ty Fyffe, DJ Paul and Juicy J. It features appearances from 12 Gauge, Big Pun, Big Tray Deee, Black Child, Buckshot, Canibus, Common, Do Or Die, Flipmode Squad, Gotta Boyz, Raekwon, Slick Rick, Smif-N-Wessun, Snoop Dogg, Soopafly, T-Bo, Tha Dogg Pound, The WhoRidas, Three 6 Mafia, Tommy Finger, Trick Daddy, Wildliffe Society, and 6430.

The album peaked at number 145 on the Billboard 200 and number 50 on the Top R&B/Hip-Hop Albums in the United States. Its single  "Come Get It" reached number 73 on the Hot R&B/Hip-Hop Songs chart.

Track listing

Personnel
Vlado Meller – mastering
Ezra Swerdlow – executive producer
Henri Kessler – executive producer
Marc Levin – executive producer
Steve Gottlieb – executive producer
Mark Ruberg – soundtrack coordinator
Lisa West – soundtrack supervisor
Patricia Joseph – soundtrack supervisor
Jackie Sussman – soundtrack music clearance
Russell Lefferts – soundtrack music clearance
Stephanie Kika – soundtrack music clearance
Benjamin Wheelock – art direction
Arnold Katz – photography

Charts

References

External links

Hip hop soundtracks
1999 soundtrack albums
Comedy film soundtracks
TVT Records soundtracks
Albums produced by DJ Paul
Albums produced by Juicy J
Albums produced by Ty Fyffe
Albums produced by Irv Gotti
Albums produced by Daz Dillinger
Albums produced by the Infinite Arkatechz